The A11 motorway is a partially built motorway in north-western part of Romania, planned to connect the cities of Arad and Oradea. As of January 2022, the only operational segment is a  section from Arad West Interchange (A1) to DN7 (Arad North), known as the Arad Bypass.

History
The current segment in service was built as part of the Arad Bypass section of the A1 motorway, that was opened in December 2011 (on a single carriageway) and June 2012 (on both carriageways). In July 2015, when the Arad – Nădlac section of the A1 motorway became operational, it changed its route number from A1 to A11.

Part of the proposed route of Via Carpathia, the motorway is planned to be extended towards Oradea and connected to the A3 motorway, having 2x2 lanes on 43 km and 3x3 lanes on 14 km. The other 76 km are planned to be built under the expressway (DX) standards.

In early 2022, Hungary expressed its interest for an eventual connection of the A11 near Salonta to its M44 motorway, towards Kecskemét.

As of December 2022, the northern segment is under construction. This segment will connect A3 motorway with Oradea south bypass road.

Exit list

References

Motorways in Romania